Attila Tóth (born 12 April 1965) is a retired Hungarian ice dancer. He competed with Klára Engi. Together, they placed 16th at the 1984 Winter Olympics, 7th at the 1988 Winter Olympics, and 7th at the 1992 Winter Olympics. Their highest placement at the World Figure Skating Championships was 4th, which they achieved in 1989. Their highest placement at the European Figure Skating Championships was 4th, which they achieved in 1989, 1990, and 1991.
Tóth was born in Budapest.

Results
(ice dance with Klára Engi)

References
 Skatabase: 1980s Olympics
 Skatabase: 1990s Olympics

Navigation

Hungarian male ice dancers
Olympic figure skaters of Hungary
Figure skaters at the 1984 Winter Olympics
Figure skaters at the 1988 Winter Olympics
Figure skaters at the 1992 Winter Olympics
1965 births
Living people